Neil Caradus McLeod (born 14 September 1952 in Whangarei) is a former field hockey player from New Zealand. He was a member of the national team that won the gold medal at the 1976 Summer Olympics in Montreal.

References
 New Zealand Olympic Committee

New Zealand male field hockey players
Olympic field hockey players of New Zealand
Field hockey players at the 1976 Summer Olympics
Olympic gold medalists for New Zealand
1952 births
Living people
Field hockey players from Whangārei
Olympic medalists in field hockey
Medalists at the 1976 Summer Olympics